Charles Moffat Howe (1851–1920) was a dentist and the Mayor of Passaic, New Jersey.  He was mayor for four terms, and was president of Passaic National Bank, and president of the local YMCA.

References

1851 births
1920 deaths
Mayors of Passaic, New Jersey